Neusas is a genus of sea snails, marine gastropod mollusks in the family Tornidae within the superfamily Truncatelloidea.

The systematic position of this genus is uncertain. It is probably not in Tornidae.

Species
 Neusas brooksi Fernández-Garcés, Rubio & Rolán, 2018
 Neusas distorta Rubio & Rolán, 2018
 Neusas inesae Rubio & Rolán, 2018
 Neusas juliae Rubio & Rolán, 2018
 Neusas marshalli (Sykes, 1925)

References

External links
 
 Warén A. & Bouchet P. (2001). Gastropoda and Monoplacophora from hydrothermal vents and seeps new taxa and records. The Veliger, 44(2): 116-231

Tornidae
Gastropod genera